Daltoni (translation: The Daltons) were a Yugoslav rock band formed in Niš in 1963. They were one of the pioneers of the Yugoslav rock scene.

Formed by high school students, Daltoni initially performed beat music. In the mid-1960s they became one of the most popular Yugoslav bands. They released their only studio release, the EP , in 1968, with the title track becoming a nationwide hit. At the end of the 1960s the band moved towards more contemporary sound, but failed to sustain their popularity, disbanding in 1971.

Band history

1963–1971
The band was formed in August 1963 by Branislav Cvetković (who at first took up guitar, but soon switched to bass guitar) Žarko Stanković (guitar), Rista Trajković (rhythm guitar) and Nebojša Stojanović (drums). At the time, all of the members were sixteen years old. For their first public appearance, at the Gimnazijada festival in Skopje, the band was joined by vocalist Miodrag Rašić. At first the band mostly performed cover versions of The Shadows' songs. The band had their first public appearance in their hometown in 1965, at the club Index. The band would continue to perform in the club, where vocal duties were occasionally given to Dušan Mitrović and Miša "Šolja" Tašić, and Mihajlo "Mika" Paligorić was temporarily the band's drummer. The band was soon joined by keyboardist Miodrag "Miško" Stojanović.

In 1966, Rašić officially left the band; he died several years later in a car accident. He was replaced by Goce Nikolovski from the rival group Rubinsi (The Rubies). The new lineup presented themselves for the first time at the Niš Faculty of Technical Science on 29 November 1966. The band soon gained the status of a live attraction. In January 1967 they won the first place at Belgrade's second Gitarijada festival. In May the band performed at the Zagreb second Festival of Vocal-Instrumental Ensembles and in September of the same year they won the first place at the first Niš Gitarijada festival. On October 30, the band organized their first solo concert in Belgrade, at Belgrade Youth Center. In the first part of the concert they performed cover versions of The Beatles' songs, including most of the tracks from the album Sgt Pepper's Lonely Hearts Club Band, and in the second half they played their own songs.

By the end of 1967, the band had already changed the lineup with Trajković and Cvetković being replaced by Žarko Bajagić (bass guitar) and Dragan Nikolić (rhythm guitar), both former members of Rubinsi. Their transfer from Rubinsi led to a physical fight between the members of two bands, after which Bajagić ended up with a broken jaw. The following year, the band performed at the Skopje Fair and prepared their debut EP  ('Dream Hand'), released by Jugoton. It was the first official release by a rock group from Niš. The EP featured four tracks: "" ('Friday'), "" ('I Think about the Past Sometimes'), "" ('I Love Our Truth') and the title track, which became a hit on Yugoslav radio stations. Having released the EP, the band went on a Serbian tour, performing first in Niš, in December 1968, at the Park cinema, and a few days later, on December 25, at the Golden Guitar festival in Belgrade, ending up at the fourth place. At this performance, keyboardist Rade Radivojević performed with the band for the first time.

During the summer of the following year, the band went on an Adriatic seaside resort tour including the MOC festival in Bečići. On their return, the band held a concert at the Niš JNA Dome, and on March 8, the band organized a marathon concert on which they performed for twenty-eight hours, beating the record held by the Sarajevo band Čičak for about two hours. During the concert Daltoni performed over three hundred songs. This event attracted some attention from the foreign press.

During the same year, the band moved to Belgrade and in May performed at the Pop Stars '70 festival. With the new keyboardist Josip Kolbert, the band performed at various venues including the Euridika club and the Belgrade Youth Center, expanding their repertoire with the up-to-date hits, thus changing their musical style. At the time, the majority of the band's performances were covers of bands such as Jethro Tull, Family, Blood, Sweat & Tears, Sly and the Family Stone and Blodwyn Pig. In mid-1970, Radivojević returned to the band and drummer Stojanović went to serve the army, being replaced by Mika Paligorić. This lineup often performed at the Niš Faculty of Civil Engineering and prepared new songs, which were recorded at the studio of Radio Niš, but the material was not released. In the meantime, in May, the band went on a tour across Istria, returning to Niš in October 1971, when the band officially disbanded. During the 1970s, some of the band members held occasional club performances under the name Daltoni.

Post-disbandment reunions and releases

In 1999 the unreleased recorded material, along with a part of Faculty of Civil Engineering performance and the first EP was released on the band's self-released compilation Anthology. In 2005, the song "" appeared on the box set  (1956–1970) ('When Rock Was Young – East Side Stories (1956–1970)'), released by Croatia Records in 2005 and featuring songs by the pioneering Yugoslav rock acts.

Discography

EPs
 (1968)

Compilations
Anthology (1999)

References

External links 
Daltoni at Discogs
 

Serbian rock music groups
Yugoslav rock music groups
Instrumental rock musical groups
Beat groups
Musical groups from Niš
Musical groups established in 1963
Musical groups disestablished in 1971
1963 establishments in Yugoslavia